This is a list of WBA world champions, showing every world champion certified by the World Boxing Association (WBA). The list also includes champions certified by the National Boxing Association (NBA), the predecessor to the WBA.

Boxers who won the title but were stripped due to the title bout being overturned to a no contest are not listed.

In December 2000, the WBA created an unprecedented situation of having a split championship in the same weight class by introducing a new title called Super world, commonly referred to simply as Super. The Super champion is the WBA's primary champion, while the World champion – commonly known as the Regular champion by boxing publications – is only considered the primary champion by the other three major sanctioning bodies (WBC, IBF, and WBO) if the Super title is vacant.

A Unified champion is a boxer that holds the primary WBA title and one or two from another major sanctioning body (WBC, IBF, WBO) simultaneously. An Undisputed champion as defined by the WBA, only needs to hold three of the four major titles but in some cases they may change a Super champion into an Undisputed champion after a failed title defense (e.g. Anselmo Moreno losing to Juan Payano and Chris John losing to Simpiwe Vetyeka). This is not to be confused by professional boxing's own definition of an undisputed champion, in which a boxer must hold all four major titles.

There are two tables per section. The primary champion lineage prioritizes the Super champions. If the Super title is vacant, then the Undisputed / Unified title is listed. If both are vacant, then the Regular title becomes the primary champion. The secondary champion lineage lists the Regular or Unified champions while the primary champion is occupied.

Every Super champion is the primary champion.
A Regular champion is a primary champion only if Super, Undisputed and Unified is vacant.
A Unified champion is a primary champion only if Super is vacant.
Not every Regular or Unified champion gets promoted to Super if it is vacant. 
Not every Regular champion gets to fight for the vacant Super title.
A Regular or Unified champion that is considered the primary champion is relegated to secondary champion if Super gets occupied.

Starting from August 2021, any new champions in the primary champion lineage will not be marked as Regular, Unified, Undisputed or Super because of the WBA's title reduction plan.

Heavyweight

Primary champion lineage

Secondary champion lineage

Cruiserweight

Primary champion lineage

Secondary champion lineage

Light heavyweight

Primary champion lineage

Secondary champion lineage

Super middleweight

Primary champion lineage

Secondary champion lineage

Middleweight

Primary champion lineage

Secondary champion lineage

Super welterweight

Primary champion lineage

Secondary champion lineage

Welterweight

Primary champion lineage

Secondary champion lineage

Super lightweight

Primary champion lineage

Secondary champion lineage

Lightweight

Primary champion lineage

Secondary champion lineage

Super featherweight

Primary champion lineage

Secondary champion lineage

Featherweight

Primary champion lineage

Secondary champion lineage

Super bantamweight

Primary champion lineage

Secondary champion lineage

Bantamweight

Primary champion lineage

Secondary champion lineage

Super flyweight

Primary champion lineage

Secondary champion lineage

Flyweight

Primary champion lineage

Secondary champion lineage

Light flyweight

Primary champion lineage

Secondary champion lineage

Minimumweight

Primary champion lineage

Secondary champion lineage

See also
List of current world boxing champions
List of undisputed boxing champions
List of WBC world champions
List of IBF world champions
List of WBO world champions
List of The Ring world champions
List of WBA female world champions
List of IBO world champions

Notes

External links
Official list of current WBA champions
https://boxrec.com/media/index.php/National_Boxing_Association
https://boxrec.com/media/index.php/NBA_World_Heavyweight_Title_Fights
https://boxrec.com/media/index.php/NBA_World_Heavyweight_Champion
https://titlehistories.com/boxing/wba/
All-time WBA World champions - Reference book
Ken Buchanan - Lightweight Champion of the World - Ken Buchanan site with detailed bio, statistics, full fights and more

WBA

WBA